Alberta Place Halt was a railway station in the Welsh county of Glamorgan.

History

The station was opened by the Taff Vale Railway, becoming part of the Great Western Railway during the Grouping of 1923.  The line then passed on to the Western Region of British Railways on nationalisation in 1948. It was then closed by the British Railways Board.

The site today

The station has now been demolished. The former trackbed is a linear path and walk.

References 

 
 
 
 Station on navigable O.S. map
Line Diagram 
The Site Now

Service

External links
Alberta Place Halt on navigable 1947 O.S. map

Disused railway stations in the Vale of Glamorgan
Former Taff Vale Railway stations
Railway stations in Great Britain opened in 1904
Railway stations in Great Britain closed in 1968
1904 establishments in Wales
1968 disestablishments in Wales